Florin Cezar Ouatu (born 18 February 1980), known professionally as "Cezar The Voice" [Vocea] or simply "Cezar", is a Romanian opera countertenor, singer, and pianist.

Son of the late flautist and former teacher at Mozarteum University of Salzburg, Florin Ouatu, he was born into a family of musicians in Ploiești. Cezar began playing piano at six years of age. He graduated from the "Carmen Sylva" School of Arts in his hometown and the Milan Conservatory. In Italy, Cezar graduated the bel canto classical singing section with maximum mark. He has also studied Baroque music.  In 2001, Ouatu was accepted to the Giuseppe Verdi Music Academy in Milan, and graduated in 2004. In the 2003 International Singing Contest Francisco Viñas and in the 2005 International Voice Competition organized by the Renata Tebaldi Foundation in San Marino he won the "Best Countertenor" prize. Cezar made his professional opera stage debut in 2007 at La Fenice, Venice.  He has since appeared in further opera performances in Baroque opera roles.

Ouatu released his first pop-opera single "Cinema Paradiso" on Christmas Eve, 24 December 2012. In May 2013, Cezar represented Romania in the Eurovision Song Contest 2013 with the song "It's My Life", and finished in 13th place with 65 points at the end of the contest. A week later, on 25 May 2013, he performed alongside Andrea Bocelli and Angela Gheorghiu at Bocelli's concert in Romania at the Romexpo, which led to a collaboration with Vangelis.

In 2018, he auditioned for the UK X Factor.

References

External links
 Official Florin Cezar Ouatu web page
 Das Opernglas, ePaper Ausgabe 10/2011 
 International Singing Contest Francisco Viñas, Prize winners 2001-2010
 Sue Loder, "A Cut Too Far…..the new Giulio Cesare in Lausanne".  Opera Today, 22 April 2008

1980 births
People from Ploiești
Operatic countertenors
21st-century Romanian male opera singers
Romanian pianists
Living people
Articles containing video clips
Eurovision Song Contest entrants of 2013
Male pianists
21st-century pianists
Milan Conservatory alumni